Army Corps of Engineers v. Hawkes Co., 578 U.S. ___ (2016), was a case in which the Supreme Court of the United States held that a Clean Water Act jurisdictional determination issued by the United States Army Corps of Engineers is reviewable under the Administrative Procedure Act because jurisdictional determinations constitute "final agency action".

Background
The Clean Water Act prohibits the discharge of pollutants into "waters of the United States" without a valid permit. Because it is sometimes difficult to determine whether property contains waters of the United States, the United States Army Corps of Engineers issues jurisdictional determinations (on a case-by-case basis) that specify whether property contains waters of the United States. In this case, the United States Army Corps of Engineers issued a jurisdictional determination, which stated that property owned by peat mine operators in Marshall County, Minnesota included waters of the United States because it contained wetlands that "had a 'significant nexus' to the Red River of the North". The mine operators filed suit to challenge the Corps's jurisdictional determination under the Administrative Procedure Act, but the district court ruled that it could not exercise subject matter jurisdiction because the jurisdictional determination did not constitute "final agency action". The United States Court of Appeals for the Eighth Circuit reversed the district court's ruling, and the Supreme Court of the United States granted certiorari to review the case.

Opinion of the Court
In a majority opinion written by Chief Justice John Roberts, the Supreme Court rejected The Corps’ contentions that the jurisdictional determination “is not ”final agency action” and that, even if it were, there are adequate alternatives for challenging it in court." Justice Anthony Kennedy wrote a concurring opinion in which he was joined by Justice Clarence Thomas and Justice Samuel Alito, where he argued that "the Court is right to construe a [jurisdictional determination] as binding in light of the fact that in many instances it will have a significant bearing on whether the Clean Water Act comports with due process." Justice Elena Kagan also wrote a separate concurring opinion in which she argued that jurisdictional determinations are reviewable because "legal consequences will flow" from the Corps' determinations. Justice Ruth Bader Ginsburg wrote a separate opinion concurring in part and concurring in the judgment in which she argued that there was nothing tentative or informal about jurisdictional determinations, and that the Corps' determinations have "an immediate and practical impact."

See also 
 List of United States Supreme Court cases
 Lists of United States Supreme Court cases by volume
 List of United States Supreme Court cases by the Roberts Court

References

External links
 

United States Supreme Court cases
United States Supreme Court cases of the Roberts Court
2016 in United States case law
Marshall County, Minnesota
Red River of the North
Mining in Minnesota
Peat mining
United States Army Corps of Engineers
United States water case law
United States environmental case law